In volcanology, an explosive eruption is a volcanic eruption of the most violent type. A notable example is the 1980 eruption of Mount St. Helens. Such eruptions result when sufficient gas has dissolved under pressure within a viscous magma such that expelled lava violently froths into volcanic ash when pressure is suddenly lowered at the vent. Sometimes a lava plug will block the conduit to the summit, and when this occurs, eruptions are more violent. This cloud may subsequently collapse, creating a fast-moving pyroclastic flow of hot volcanic matter.

Stages of an explosive eruption

An explosive eruption begins with some form of blockage in the crater of a volcano that prevents the release of gases trapped in highly viscous andesitic or rhyolitic magma. The pressure of the magma builds until the blockage is blasted out in an explosive eruption through the weakest point in the cone, usually the crater. (However, in the case of the eruption of Mount St. Helens, the pressure was released on the side of the volcano, rather than the crater.)

The sudden release of pressure causes the gases in the magma to suddenly froth and create volcanic ash and pumice, which is then ejected through the volcanic vent to create the eruption column commonly associated with explosive eruptions. The size and duration of the column depend on the volume of magma released and how much pressure it was under.

Types of explosive eruptions
 Vulcanian eruption
 Peléan eruption
 Plinian eruption
 Phreatic eruption
 Phreatomagmatic eruption
 Surtseyan eruption
 Consequences:
 Eruption column
 Pyroclastic flow
 Pyroclastic fall
 Pyroclastic surge

Pyroclastic flows
Pyroclastic flows occur toward the end of explosive eruptions, as volcanic gases are depleted and the gas pressure that supports the eruption column declines. When the pressure falls, the eruption column begins to collapse in on itself, and ash and rock fall back to the ground and flow down the slopes of the volcano. The high temperatures can burn flammable materials in the flow's path, including wood, vegetation, and buildings. Alternately, when an eruption has contact with snow, crater lakes, or wet soil in large amounts, water mixing into the flow can create lahars, which pose significant known risks worldwide.

Supervolcanoes

The eruptions of supervolcanoes are the rarest of volcanic eruptions but also the most destructive. The timescale between these eruptions is generally marked by hundreds of thousands of years.  This type of eruption generally causes destruction on a continental scale, and can also result in the lowering of temperatures worldwide.

See also
 Effusive eruption
 Volcanic explosivity index

References

External links
 

Volcanic eruption types